Oxalicibacterium faecigallinarum is a Gram-negative, rod-shaped, non-spore-forming, yellow-pigmented, oxidase and catalase positive, and oxalotrophic bacterium from the genus Oxalicibacterium and family  Oxalobacteraceae.

References

External links
Type strain of Oxalicibacterium faecigallinarum at BacDive -  the Bacterial Diversity Metadatabase

Burkholderiales
Bacteria described in 2009